The Canton of Chârost is a canton situated in the Cher département and in the Centre-Val de Loire region of France. It has 14,092 inhabitants (2018, without double counting).

Geography
A farming and forestry area in the valley of the Arnon, in the western part of the arrondissement of Bourges and centred on the town of Chârost. The altitude varies from 113m at Poisieux to 173m at Lunery, with an average altitude of 149m.

The canton comprises the following 13 communes:

Chârost
Civray
Lunery
Mareuil-sur-Arnon
Morthomiers
Plou
Poisieux
Primelles
Saint-Ambroix
Saint-Florent-sur-Cher
Saugy
Le Subdray
Villeneuve-sur-Cher

Population

See also
 Arrondissements of the Cher department
 Cantons of the Cher department
 Communes of the Cher department

References

Charost